Kaliyugam is a 1988 Indian Tamil-language action film directed by debutant K. Subash, starring Prabhu, Raghuvaran Amala and Geetha. It was released on 8 November 1988.

Plot 

Kaliyugam is the story of an honest police officer and a lawyer who often had to take the route of action to help the poor from the rich and powerful.

Cast 
Prabhu
Raghuvaran
Amala
Geetha
Janagaraj
Ponnambalam
P. S. Veerappa
Pradeep Shakthi

Soundtrack 
Soundtrack was composed by Chandrabose.

Reception 
NKS of The Indian Express wrote, "Kaliyugam shares with Nayagan and Agni Natchathiram a penchant for dramatic washed-out lighting schemes". Jayamanmadhan of Kalki criticised the film for its story and music, as well as over-reliance on action.

References

External links 
 

1980s Tamil-language films
1988 action films
1988 films
Films directed by K. Subash
Films scored by Chandrabose (composer)
Indian action films